Wolfgang Löscher (born 3 October 1949, Berlin, Germany) is a Professor in the Department of Pharmacology, Toxicology, and Pharmacy at the University of Veterinary Medicine Hannover, Germany and also a member of the National Academy of Sciences Leopoldina.

Education
Löscher graduated from the Free University of Berlin in 1974 with a degree in veterinary medicine, followed by his doctoral degree (Dr.med.vet.) at the same university.

Research and career
Löscher did postdoctoral research work for five years particularly in neuropharmacology and toxicology in Germany and Denmark. His research interests include pharmacology of antiepileptic (antiseizure) drugs, the mechanisms of antiseizure drugs, and the pathophysiology of temporal lobe epilepsy with the aim to find new targets for treatment and also evaluated antiepileptic drugs for dogs. While at FU Berlin, Löscher worked alongside Hans-Hasso Frey to pioneer neurochemical studies of antiepileptic drugs such as valproate on the synthesis and metabolism of the inhibitory neurotransmitter GABA. After his move to Hannover, models, and mechanisms of resistance to antiepileptic drugs developed into one of the major research areas of Löscher group.

During the initial days of his career, he worked as a visiting scientist at the National Institute of Health in Bethesda, Maryland, USA. During his tenure at the University of Veterinary Medicine Hannover, he held different positions including Professor and Director of the Department of Pharmacology, Toxicology, and Pharmacy. In 2019, he retired from the chair position to become a research professor and head of an epilepsy research group at the University of Veterinary Medicine, Hannover. Since 2002, Löscher has been Head of the Center of Systems Neuroscience (ZSN) in Hannover.

Awards and honors
In 1980, Löscher received the Alfred Hauptmann Award by the Epilepsy Board of Trustees.  Additional awards include the Magyar-Kossa Memorial Medal and the Ambassador for Epilepsy research Award of the International League against epilepsy.

He won a Walter Frei prize from the University of Zurich and European Epileptology Award from ILAE (International League Against Epilepsy) in the year 2014.

Publications

References 

German veterinarians
1949 births
Scientists from Berlin
Free University of Berlin alumni
Epileptologists
National Institutes of Health people
Living people